Rafael Obligado, formerly Esteban Echeverría, is a town in Rojas Partido in Buenos Aires Province, Argentina. It is named after Rafael Obligado, an Argentine poet and playwright.

History 
Founded on 20 March 1887, the town was first named in honor of poet and writer Esteban Echeverría. Later, the name of the town was cut short to Echeverría. In the late 1920s, the town was renamed in honor of playwright and poet Rafael Obligado; the name change was in large part made to avoid confusion with Esteban Echeverría Partido, also in Buenos Aires Province.

Fiesta Provincial de la Galleta 
Every November since 1971, a biscuit festival is held in Rafael Obligado. The event includes traditional parades, shows, the election of a "queen", and a lunch of asado and traditional biscuits from the region. The fiesta is an opportunity for a reunion of members of the region and those who have left it for work or personal reasons.

Notable people 

 Lisandro López (born 1983), footballer

References 

Populated places in Buenos Aires Province
Populated places established in 1877